Jaipuria Vidyalaya is a co-educational school in Jaipur, Rajasthan, India. It was founded in 1993 and affiliated to Central Board of Secondary Education (CBSE). The school is located at Jawahar Lal Nehru Marg and Jaipuria Hospital on the foothills of Aravalli Range  in Jaipur.

History
The foundation stone of Jaipuria Vidyalaya was laid by Haridev Joshi, then Chief Minister of Rajasthan on 3 December 1987.

References

External links
 

Schools in Jaipur